Yuncheng District is a district of the city of Yunfu, Guangdong Province, China.

External links

County-level divisions of Guangdong
Yunfu